Alix Combelle (15 June 1912 – 26 February 1978) was a French swing saxophonist, clarinetist, and bandleader. He recorded often with Django Reinhardt and the Quintette du Hot Club de France.

Career
A native of Paris, his father was François Combelle, who played classical saxophone with the Band of the Republican Guard. Alix Combelle played drums in the late 1920s. In the early 1930s he played clarinet and saxophone in theater pit orchestras in Paris. He was a member of a bands led by Gregor (Krikor Kelekian), Arthur Briggs, Michel Warlop, Guy Paquinet, and Ray Ventura. He worked with visiting American musicians such as Benny Carter, Adelaide Hall, Coleman Hawkins, Freddy Johnson, and Danny Polo. He was a member of Bill Coleman's band when it included Argentinian swing guitarist Oscar Aleman. He performed with French singers such as Charles Trenet and Jean Sablon and recorded with Philippe Brun. In the 1940s he led the band Jazz de Paris. His son, Philippe, was a drummer.

Discography

References

1912 births
1978 deaths
Musicians from Paris
Continental jazz clarinetists
Continental jazz saxophonists
Swing clarinetists
Swing saxophonists
French jazz saxophonists
Male saxophonists
French jazz clarinetists
French jazz bandleaders
20th-century French musicians
20th-century saxophonists
20th-century French male musicians
French male jazz musicians